Tyrion Davis-Price (born October 23, 2000) is an American football running back for the San Francisco 49ers of the National Football League (NFL). He played college football at LSU.

Early life and high school
Davis-Price grew up in Baton Rouge, Louisiana and attended Southern University Laboratory School. As a senior, he rushed for over 2,500 yards and scored 29 touchdowns. Davis-Price committed to play college football at LSU.

College career
Davis-Price rushed 64 times for 295 yards and six touchdowns during his true freshman season as LSU won the 2020 College Football Playoff National Championship. He was the Tigers' leading rusher with 446 yards and three touchdowns on 104 carries in 2020. As a junior, Davis-Price rushed 211 times for 1,003 yards and six touchdowns. Against 20th-ranked Florida, he rushed for a school-record 287 yards in a 49–42 win. Following the end of the season, Davis-Price declared that he would be entering the 2022 NFL Draft.

Professional career

Davis-Price was selected in the third round of the 2022 NFL Draft with the 93rd overall pick by the San Francisco 49ers. He made his NFL debut in Week 2 against the Seattle Seahawks and had 14 carries for 33 yards in the 27–7 victory. He played in six games and recorded 34 carries for 99 rushing yards in his rookie season.

References

External links
 San Francisco 49ers bio
LSU Tigers bio

Living people
American football running backs
LSU Tigers football players
Players of American football from Baton Rouge, Louisiana
San Francisco 49ers players
2000 births